East Ayrshire Community Hospital is a community hospital located in Ayr Road, Cumnock, Scotland. It is managed by NHS Ayrshire and Arran.

History
The hospital was commissioned to replace Ballochmyle Hospital. It was procured under a Private Finance Initiative contract in 1999. It was designed by MacLachlan Monaghan, built by BAM Construction at a cost of £9 million and completed in August 2000.

Services
Facilities include 24 in-patient beds, an outpatient suite, 13 beds for elderly people and 16 beds for elderly people with mental health issues. There is also a community dental practice.

References

External links
 

Hospital buildings completed in 2000
NHS Scotland hospitals
Hospitals in East Ayrshire